The Battle of Condore took place near Masulipatam on 9 December 1758 during the Third Carnatic War, part of the Seven Years' War. An Anglo-Indian force under the command of Colonel Francis Forde attacked and defeated a similarly sized French force under the command of Hubert de Brienne, Comte de Conflans, capturing all their baggage and artillery. The victory allowed the British to lay siege to Masulipatam, which they stormed on 25 January 1759.

Bibliography
 Harvey, Robert. Clive: The Life and Death of a British Emperor. Sceptre, 1999.
 Henty, George Alfred. With Clive in India. Or, The Beginnings of an Empire.
 Keay, John. The Honourable Company: A History of the English East India Company. Harper Collins, 1993
 McLynn, Frank. 1759: The Year Britain Became Master of the World. Pimlico, 2005.

External links
 Battle of Condore at Project SYW, a wiki on the Seven Years' War
 Battle of Condore at FIBIS wiki

Battles involving France
Battles involving Great Britain
Battles of the Seven Years' War
1758 in India
Conflicts in 1758